Antipolo's 2nd congressional district is one of the two congressional districts of the Philippines in the city of Antipolo and one of four in the province of Rizal. It has been represented in the House of Representatives of the Philippines since 2004. The district consists of the eastern Antipolo barangays of Calawis, Cupang, Dalig, Inarawan, San Jose, San Juan, San Luis and San Roque. It is currently represented in the 19th Congress by Romeo Acop of the National Unity Party (NUP).

Representation history

Election results

2022

2019

2016

2013

2010

See also
Legislative districts of Antipolo

References

Congressional districts of the Philippines
Politics of Antipolo
2003 establishments in the Philippines
Congressional districts of Calabarzon
Constituencies established in 2003